Nidji is an Indonesian rock band based in Jakarta. Formed in February 2002, Nidji's name comes from the Japanese word niji (虹), meaning "rainbow". The band's music can be classified under the alternative pop genre, and the band has cited Coldplay and The Killers as major influences. The band currently consists of Yusuf Ubay (vocals/saxophone), Andro Regantoro (bass), Randy Danistha (keyboards/synthesizers), Ramadhista Akbar and Andi Ariel Harsya (guitars), and Adri Prakarsa (drums).
 
The band has released six singles: "Child", "Sudah", "Hapus Aku", "Kau dan Aku", "Disco Lazy Time" and "Biarlah". Two of the singles, "Heaven" from the Breakthru' album and  "Shadows", taken from the Top Up album, were used as background music in the Southeast Asian third season promos for the television series Heroes, and they provided soundtrack music for the Indonesian film Laskar Pelangi.

The album Breakthru''' was released in 2005 with an English-language version the following year. The second album, Top Up, was released in 2007.

 History 
Nidji was formed in February 2002. The beginnings of Nidji came about through the friendship between Rama and Andro. They were joined by Arieland together they wrote a song entitled "Maria". However, "Maria" was not completed until Giring met them and added some vocals.

Afterwards, Andro recommended Adri who had often done jam sessions with him to fill the position of drummer. The four of them then invited Rama to join. At the beginning of April 2005, Nidji added another member, Randy, a keyboard player who was a close friend of Giring.

In 2012, the "Liberty Victoria" song was used by Manchester United as a new anthem.

Five years later, on April 5, 2017, the band released a new album entitled Love, Fake & Friendship. It is the last album that featured the original vocalist Giring before he left for his political career. From December 2018 to January 2019, Nidji and Musica Studios opened auditions to find Giring's successor. From around 2,000 participants, 10 chosen candidates had the opportunity to perform with Giring and the band. At Giring's final concert "Mimpi adalah Kunci" on February 2, 2019, Yusuf Ubay, who was also a 2014 Indonesian Idol'' contestant, was chosen as Nidji's new vocalist.

Side projects

NEV
In October 2013, Nidji formed a side project called NEV (Nidji Electronic Version), which they used as an avenue to explore their electronic side. In this project, they rearranged their songs to the electronic version. However, the remix version will not be released to be an album. They will play it in live performance only.

NEV+
Following the departure of the vocalist Giring and the hiatus of Nidji, the other five members formed a side project called NEV+ (Nidji Electronic Version Plus) in 2017. Its concept is the same with NEV. Without Giring participation, NEV name was changed to NEV+. 'Plus' means the collaboration of Nidji with a number of other singers, to fill in the gaps left by Giring.

In 2018, NEV+ alongside NOAH vocalist Nazril "Ariel" Irham and Hivi! former vocalist Dalila "Dea" Azkadiputri performed "Janger Persahabatan", a song written by Guruh Soekarnoputra. This song was made as one of the official songs for the 2018 Asian Games.

Band members

Current members
 Yusuf Ubay — lead vocals, saxophone (2019–present)
 Andi Ariel Harsya — guitar (2002–present)
 Ramadhista Akbar — guitar, backing vocals (2002–present)
 Andro Regantoro — bass guitar, backing vocals (2002–present)
 Randy Danistha — keyboards, synthesizers, backing vocals (2005–present)
 Adri Prakarsa — drums (2002–present)

Former members
 Giring Ganesha — lead vocals, guitar, piano (2002–2017)

Timeline

Discography

Studio albums

Awards 

|-
| rowspan="2"| 2006
| rowspan="2"| Nidji
| MTV Indonesia Awards —  Most Favorite Band
| 
|-
| MTV Indonesia Awards — Most Favorite New Artist
| 
|-
| rowspan="1"| 2014
| rowspan="1"| "Sumpah dan Cintaku Matiku"
| Indonesian Music Awards — Best Original Soundtrack Film
| 
|}

References

External links
 
 
 Nidji discography on Discogs
 Nidji discography on iTunes

Musical groups established in 2002
Indonesian pop music groups
Indonesian rock music groups
Anugerah Musik Indonesia winners